Cwm Welfare A.F.C. are a Welsh football club from the village of Beddau which is approximately six miles from the county town of Pontypridd in the Rhondda Cynon Taf in Wales. Formed in 1954, they have played in the Welsh Football League. They currently play in the South Wales Alliance League Division One.

History
The team was formed in 1954 entering the South Wales Amateur League. They were Division Two champions in the 1959–60 season. They club subsequently played in the Pontypridd and District League, before in 1998-99 joining the South Wales Senior League. They were Division Two champions in the 2003–04 season. A number of seasons in Division One saw them finish runners-up in the 2009–10 and 2012–13 seasons. The 2013–14 season saw them go one better and finish as Division One champions. They then won the play off final, beating Trefelin gaining promotion to the Welsh Football League. Three seasons in the league saw two mid-table finished in the Welsh Football League Division Three before they finished bottom of the league in the 2016–17 season and were relegated. The then joined the South Wales Alliance League Premier Division finishing bottom in 2017–18 but were spared relegation. In the 2018–19 season they regularly suffered sizeable defeats, including losing 12–1, 16–0 and 17–0 in December 2018 and January 2019. The club finished bottom of the league again at the end of the season and were relegated to Division One for the 2019–20 season.

Honours
Updated August 2022

South Wales Senior League Division One – Champions: 84-85; 85-86; 86-87;  87-88; 94-95; 97-98; 2013-14

South Wales Senior League Division One – Runners-Up: 93-94; 94-95; 2009–10; 2012–13

South Wales Senior League Division Two – Champions: 2003-04

South Wales Amateur League Division Two – Champions: 1959–60

Greyhound cup -  Champions  83-84; 87-88; 94-95

Horniman Cup - Champions 88-89; 94-95 RUNNERS UP 68-69

Senior Amateur cup - Champions 83-84; 85-86; 86-87; 87-88; 94-95; 97-98

SWFA Intermediate Cup - Champions 59-60

U16's SWWGL Division 2 - Champions 2021-22

U16s SWWGL SHield -  CHampions 2021-22

Welsh Football League history
Information in this section is sourced from the Football Club History Database.

Notes

References

External links
Official club Twitter
Official club Facebook
Official club website

Football clubs in Wales
1954 establishments in Wales
Association football clubs established in 1954
Welsh Football League clubs
South Wales Amateur League clubs
South Wales Senior League clubs
South Wales Alliance League clubs
Sport in Rhondda Cynon Taf